The Totnes Times is a local newspaper serving the town of Totnes and the surrounding South Hams area in Devon.  It is owned by Tindle Newspapers. Published weekly, it appears on Thursdays.

External links 
Official website

Totnes